A Cowgirl's Story is a 2017 American family film written and directed by Timothy Armstrong and starring Bailee Madison, Chloe Lukasiak and Pat Boone. It is the third film in the Cowgirls 'n Angels series.

Plot 
Seventeen year old Dusty Rhodes (Bailee Madison) goes to live with her grandfather (Pat Boone) because both of her Army parents are fighting in the Afghanistan war. Dusty attends a new high school where she makes friends with a group that includes Savanah (Chloe Lukasiak), a goth
girl whose late father also served in the Army. Dusty convinces her new friends to form an equestrian drill team that allows them to perform at rodeos and parades. Dusty's world is turned upside down by the war when her mother goes missing after her helicopter is shot down. To cope with her fear and helplessness, Dusty enlists the help of her grandfather and friends to put on a special riding performance for her parents and all of the soldiers fighting overseas. The entire town turns out in support of the event, and it becomes an unforgettable experience for everyone.

Cast 
 Bailee Madison as Dusty Rhodes
 Pat Boone as Grandpa Rhodes
 Chloe Lukasiak as Savanah Stocker
 Aidan Alexander as Trevor
 Froy Gutierrez as Jason
 James C. Victor as Randall Rhodes
 Alicia Coppola as Lt. Helen Rhodes
 Aedin Mincks as Dale

In May 2016, Bailee Madison was confirmed to be starring in the film as well as acting as a producer. Chloe Lukasiak joined the cast later in the same month. Corlandos Scott was cast to play a detective in the film.

Reception

James Plath of Family Home Theater gave the film a grade C, and wrote: "The biggest problem with A Cowgirl's Story is that everything is too far-fetched, familiar, or unbelievably easy."

References

External links

2017 direct-to-video films
2017 films
American direct-to-video films
American independent films
American sequel films
Films about horses
Horse sports in film
Rodeo in film
Sony Pictures direct-to-video films
2010s English-language films
2010s American films